Bauyrzhan Isauly Baimukhammedov (Bauyrjan Isaūly Baimūhammedov; 15 February 1948 – 5 April 2015) was a Kazakh football coach.

He played as forward and midfielder. He started his coaching career in 1982, and managed several Kazakh and Russian professional teams. In 1994, he was the head of Kazakhstan national football team. Baimukhammedov died on 5 April 2015, aged 67.

References

External links
Lyakhov.kz Ordabasy squad 2008 

1948 births
2015 deaths
Place of death missing
Soviet footballers
Kazakhstani footballers
Association football forwards
FC Ordabasy players
FC Kairat players
FC Zhenis Astana players
FC Shakhter Karagandy players
FC Zvezda Perm players
FC Chernomorets Novorossiysk players
Soviet football managers
Kazakhstani football managers
FC Ordabasy managers
Kazakhstan national under-21 football team managers
FC Astana-1964 managers
Kazakhstan national football team managers
FC Shakhter Karagandy managers
FC Akzhayik managers